Brussels Airport  is an international airport  northeast of Brussels, the capital of Belgium. In 2019, more than 26 million passengers arrived or departed at Brussels Airport, making it the 24th busiest airport in Europe. It is located in the municipality of Zaventem in the Province of Flemish Brabant in the Flemish Region of Belgium. It is home to around 260 companies, together directly employing 20,000 people and serves as the home base for Brussels Airlines and TUI fly Belgium.

The company operating the airport is known as The Brussels Airport Company N.V./S.A.; before 19 October 2006, the name was BIAC (Brussels International Airport Company), which was created by Belgian law through a merger of BATC with the ground operations departments of the RLW/RVA. Since 2011, the airport has been owned by the Toronto-based Ontario Teachers' Pension Plan (39%), Macquarie Group (Macquarie European Infrastructure Fund I and Macquarie European Infrastructure Fund III) (36%) and the Belgian State (25%).

On 22 March 2016, the airport's departures hall was severely damaged by two terrorist bomb blasts. The airport was closed until 3 April 2016, when it was reopened with temporary facilities at less than 20% of its previous capacity. It has since returned to full operations, with a record of 90,000 passengers on 29 July 2016.

History

Early years
The origins of Brussels Airport at Zaventem date back to 1940, when the German occupying force claimed  of agricultural fields reserved as a back-up airfield ("Steenokkerzeel"). There the Luftwaffe established Fliegerhorst Melsbroek and constructed 3 runways in the shape of a triangle: runway 02/20, runway 07L/25R (both of which are still in use today) and runway 12/30. The airport buildings were constructed in the nearby municipality of Melsbroek and not of Zaventem, which is why the airfield was known to the locals as Melsbroek (in Dutch) (or "Fliegerhorst Melsbroek" in German). There is an urban legend that the site of the airport was chosen by the Germans after asking locals where to build it–the Belgians then pointed to this location as it was often foggy.

After the liberation on 3 September 1944, the German infrastructure at Melsbroek fell into the hands of the British. When the old civilian airport in Haren became too small, the Belgian authorities decided to use the aerodrome at Melsbroek for the new national airport. By 1948, a new terminal building was constructed to replace the old wooden building. The civil aerodrome of Melsbroek was officially opened by Prince Charles, Count of Flanders, the prince regent, on 20 July 1948. From 1948 to 1956 many more buildings and facilities were erected, mostly on the Melsbroek side of the site.

In 1955, a railway line from Brussels city centre to the airport was constructed. The line was officially opened by King Baudouin on 15 May 1955.

In 1956 a new  runway was constructed, 07R/25L, which almost runs parallel with 07L/25R. In April 1956 the Belgian government decided to build a new airport, using the same runways, but with the buildings located within the municipality of Zaventem. In April 1957, construction started of the new terminal, preparing the airport for the 1958 World Fair. The grass runway 12/30 had to make way to allow for the new passenger terminal. This new airport was inaugurated 5 July 1958, almost just in time for the 1958 World Fair. The buildings on the Melsbroek side are still in use by the Belgian Air Force (15th Air Transport Wing), and this is still known as Melsbroek airfield. Both Zaventem Airport and Melsbroek Air Base, the military airfield, share the same runways.

Development since the 1960s

During the boom of commercial aviation in the 1960s and 1970s, several hangars were constructed. A new cargo terminal was constructed in 1976. In 1994, a brand new terminal was constructed adjacent to the old 1958 building. Two old piers were torn down and replaced by modern ones. In 2002, amidst the turmoil surrounding the demise of the national airline Sabena, a new pier was opened.

In 2005, the airport was awarded Best Airport in Europe by Airports Council International / International Air Transport Association (ACI/IATA), based on a survey of over 100,000 passengers worldwide. Brussels Airport continued to appear in top airports lists as of 2012. A direct train link with Leuven and Liège was opened on 12 December 2005.

In 2007, the airport served 17.8 million passengers, an increase of 7% over 2006. The cargo volume in the same year amounted to 780,000 tonnes, an increase of 8.9% over 2006. In 2008, the airport served 18.5 million passengers, which was an increase of 3.7% over the previous year.

Sabena's demise meant a sharp fall in passenger traffic, a blow from which the airport only slowly recovered. The airport's future is threatened by disagreement between the governments of Flanders and the Brussels Capital Region concerning night-time air traffic routes.

In March 2009, the old mechanical Flight information display systems were replaced by electronic ones. In September 2009, CEO Wilfried Van Assche resigned. One of the (unofficial) reasons was the delay in the construction of the low-cost terminal and the possible lawsuit by 52 airlines active at Brussels Airport, on the grounds of tax discrimination. It was Van Assche who started expanding the Long-Haul network (Jet Airways, Hainan Airlines, Etihad Airways and US Airways) at Brussels Airport. In February 2010 Arnaud Feist was appointed CEO.

 On 18 February 2013, in the 2013 Belgium diamond heist, eight men armed with automatic weapons and dressed in police uniforms seized 120 small parcels containing an estimated US$50 million worth of diamonds from a Helvetic Airways Fokker 100 passenger plane loaded with passengers preparing for departure to Zürich. The men drove two vehicles through a hole they had cut in the airport perimeter fence to Flight LX789, which had just been loaded with diamonds from a Brink's armored van from Antwerp. They carried out the operation within five minutes with no injuries and without firing a shot.`

2016 Brussels bombings 

On 22 March 2016, two explosions took place in Brussels Airport at 07:58 local time. One occurred near the American Airlines and Brussels Airlines check-in desks and the other next to a Starbucks coffee shop. A third bomb was found in the airport and detonated in a controlled explosion. The airport was closed after the attacks until 3 April, when it reopened with temporary facilities at less than 20% of its previous passenger capacity. Flights bound to Brussels Airport were either canceled or diverted to nearby airports such as Brussels South Charleroi Airport, Ostend–Bruges International Airport, and Schiphol. At 09:11 CET, an explosion took place at Maelbeek/Maalbeek metro station. ISIL claimed responsibility for the attacks as an act of revenge against Belgium for participation in the ongoing Military intervention against ISIL.

Facilities

Brussels Airport uses a one terminal concept, meaning that all the facilities are located under a single roof. The terminal building consists of several levels. The railway station is located on −1, buses and taxis arrive at 0, arrivals are located on level 2 and departures on level 3. Levels 2 and 3 are connected to the airport's two piers (A and B).

Pier A
The newest pier in Brussels airport was pier A, opened on 15 May 2002. This pier was destined to support flights from and to the Schengen countries (A-gates). However, since 15 October 2008 all Brussels Airlines flights to African destinations are also handled at this pier. Therefore, border control was installed towards the end of the pier in order to create a new pier. As a result, gates A61-72 were renamed T61-72. Later, Brussels Airlines' daily flight to New York was also moved here from pier B.

Until 26 March 2015, Pier A was connected to the main building via a  tunnel under the apron. Each pier used to have its own security zone, so transfer between the piers involved a security check, which for practical purposes made it to be two terminals. This tunnel was replaced by the "Connector", a new building that links both piers above ground and allows passengers to walk straight from the check-in desk to their gate in pier A or B, without changing floors. In the opposite direction, the building provides arriving passengers with a smooth and convenient passage to the baggage reclaim hall and the exit. Furthermore, border control has been relocated behind the 25-lane screening platform (Europe's largest) inside the Connector which means that changing planes no longer requires a security check.

Pier B
Pier B is the oldest pier still in use at Brussels Airport and is only used for flights outside the Schengen Area. Pier B is connected immediately to the main departure hall and consists of two decks. The upper deck (level 3) is at the same level as the departure halls and is used for the departing passengers, whereas the lower deck (level 2) is used for arriving passengers and connects immediately to border control and the baggage claim area.

Planned

Pier A West
Pier A West is a planned expansion of Pier A, and is meant to relieve Pier B by also handling flights from non-Schengen countries. Pier A West was due to open in 2016, but because of the slow passenger growth, Brussels Airport announced in July 2013 that the works would be delayed. However, in November 2015, Brussels Airport announced a major 550 million euro investment and pointed out that within this investment the extension of the pier is included.

Low-cost pier
Just as is the case for Pier A West, the construction of a new low-cost pier is currently on hold. It will be built roughly where the old south pier used to be. In autumn 2013, low-cost carrier Pegasus Airlines announced it would end its flights between Brussels Airport and Turkey. The service between Brussels and Istanbul–Sabiha Gökçen would relocate to Brussels-South Charleroi Airport. However, Turkish Airlines announced on 26 November 2013 it would offer one daily flight on the same route, starting one month after Pegasus terminated its operations at the airport. One day later, Ryanair announced the opening of a second Belgian base at Brussels Airport, giving a boost to low-cost traffic at Brussels Airport. Ryanair announced on 27 November 10 new routes from Brussels Airport, although Brussels-South Charleroi Airport will remain the low-cost carrier's primary Belgian base.

Services
Drinking water fountains are found all over the airport. After security check-in, water bottles are available for a small fee.

Shops, bars and restaurants are scattered throughout the building. A few facilities are located in the departure area. These are mostly convenience stores and small shops such as the airport shop, a pharmacy, Relay stores and a coffee shop. But most of the facilities can only be accessed after Security control –and are tax free. Several brands and chains have a branch in both piers, however several only operate in pier A. The airport also features places of worship (for Catholics, Jews, Muslims, Orthodox Christians and Protestants), as well as a place for meditation for humanists. The airport provides meeting facilities and can host congresses up to 600 participants, either in the Regus Skyport Meeting Center or in the Sheraton Brussels Airport Hotel. The latter is the only hotel located on the airport grounds, opposite the terminal. Shuttle services are provided to 14 nearby hotels.

All passengers now have unlimited free Wi-Fi access.

There is a small smoking room next to gate A67 in the transfer section of pier A.

Other facilities
Several airlines have or had its head offices at the grounds of Brussels Airport. Brussels Airlines has its corporate head office in the b.house, Airport Building 26, located in Diegem, Machelen. European Air Transport had its head office in Building 4–5, in Zaventem. Before Sabena went out of business, its head office was in the Sabena House on the grounds of Brussels Airport. When it existed, Virgin Express had its head office in Building 116 in Zaventem. SN Brussels, which formed in 2002, had its head office in Airport Building 117 in Zaventem when it existed. Prior to its disestablishment, Sobelair had its head office in Building 45 in Zaventem. CityBird was based in building 117D. The cargo airline Cargo B Airlines had its head office in the Brucarco Building 706 in Zaventem.

Airlines and destinations

Passenger
The following airlines operate regular scheduled and charter flights to and from Brussels:

: The flight from Kigali to Brussels continues on to London Heathrow and then goes back to Brussels. However, Rwandair doesn't have the traffic rights to transport passengers solely between Brussels and London Heathrow.

Cargo

Statistics

Traffic

 The relapse in 2001 and 2002 is due to the combined effects of the September 11 Attacks and the collapse of then home carrier Sabena in the final quarter of 2001. 
 The Cargo relapse in 2008 and 2009 is due to the combined effects of the Financial crisis of 2007–08, also affecting passenger volumes in 2009, and the relocation of DHL Aviation to Leipzig/Halle Airport. DHL departed after the Belgian government decided they couldn't operate more cargo flights at night because of noise for the people living in the surrounding area.
 The 2016 decrease in passenger numbers and aircraft movements results from the 2016 Brussels bombings which caused the airport to close for 11 days before reopening with severely reduced capacity.

Routes

Ground transportation

Road

Brussels Airport can be reached by car via the A201, which is directly connected to the Brussels Ring Road. From there, the main highways of Belgium can directly be accessed. Private partners provide three car parks at the airport, offering in total 10,600 parking spaces. Shell operates a self-service gas station near the exit of the airport complex.

Several car rental services are located in the airport as well. Europcar, Hertz, Sixt and Thrifty all operate at Brussels Airport. DriveNow also offers a car-sharing service at Brussels airport located at P3 Holiday Parking, and Zipcar has parking spaces. Taxi2Share provides sharing cab service from airport.

De Lijn provides bus transportation to and from various cities in Flanders from platforms A and B (via Brucargo). The MIVB/STIB provides transportation into Brussels city centre from Schuman railway station, Brussels Luxembourg Station and Trône Metro Station via line 12 from platform C. Platform E is used by the Hotel Shuttles, offering shuttle services to several hotels near the area.

Taxis are permanently available in front of the arrivals hall. Licensed taxis can be recognized by the blue and yellow emblem.

Rail

The Airport Railway Station is located under the airport building at level −1. The train station has direct services to Antwerp, Brussels, De Panne, Ghent, Hasselt, Landen, Leuven, Mechelen, Nivelles and Quévy. At least four trains per hour serve the most used link to Brussels South Railway Station, where international connections are offered by Eurostar (to London), Thalys (to Amsterdam, Avignon, Cologne, Essen, Lille, Marseille, Paris and Valence), ICE (to Cologne and Frankfurt), and Eurocity (to Basel, Bern, Chur, Luxembourg and Zürich).

A direct train link with Leuven was opened on 12 December 2005. A direct link with Antwerp and Mechelen via the so-called Diabolo line was opened for public service on 10 June 2012. The Diabolo project is a public-private partnership. It has been decided that all rail passengers to the Brussels National Airport railway station pay a "Diabolo supplement" to finance the ongoing and planned work.

As of December 2014, a direct train link between Bruges and the Airport will be offered, just as an Intercity service to Schiphol and Amsterdam.

Since the new Schuman-Josaphat tunnel has been finished, a new connection has been established to connect Brussels Airport directly to the stations of the EU quarter, being Brussels-Schuman and Brussels-Luxembourg. This brought the travel time between the Airport and the EU quarter to 15 minutes. The Belgian Railways announced the line to open as an hourly service. However, the line now sees a train every 30 minutes on weekdays.

Tram
In an attempt to alleviate gridlock around Brussels, the Flemish regional transport company De Lijn started the Brabantnet project, which was then scheduled to be finished by 2020.
Three new light rail lines will be created, of which 2 will terminate at Brussels Airport:

 The Airport Tram, connecting Brussels Airport to Brussels-North, but taking a different trajectory from the existing railway line;
 The Ring Tram, roughly following the northern side of the Brussels Ring and connecting several Brussels suburbs and Vilvoorde to the Airport.

To speed up the process, testing started in August 2016 with a Trambus, a Bus rapid transit system developed by Belgian bus builder Van Hool, which requires less investment than a tram. The Ringtrambus started service on 28 July 2020, using 14 24-metre double-articulated buses. The initial half-hourly service is to be upgraded to quarter-hourly on 1 September 2020. Route 820 runs between Brussels Airport and the Brussels University Hospital in Jette, via Brucargo, the station and the centre of Vilvoorde, the Kassei neighbourhood, the employment area around the Medialaan, Strombeek and the Heysel. This solution is presented as an in-between step until the tram line is finished.

The Airport Tram will be an extension of present Brussels Tram line 55 and line 62, and will roughly follow the A201 Motorway, but will need a large bridge to cross the Brussels Ring into the Airport.

Bicycle
Brussels Airport has a special separated road that provides access to the airport for bikers and pedestrians. There is also a special place to park bikes. Since 2019, the airport has a direct connection from the bicycle freeway  Brussels – Leuven ("Fietssnelweg F3"). In 2016, merely 1% of employees were commuting by bike. In an effort to further increase this number, bicycle leasing was introduced to employees, and in 2020 almost 10% of the Brussels Airport employees signed up for this.

Accidents and incidents

On 15 February 1961, Sabena Flight 548, a Boeing 707, crashed during approach on runway 20, killing all 72 people on board and one on the ground. This was the first fatal accident involving a Boeing 707, resulting in the death of the entire United States Figure Skating team on its way to the World Figure Skating Championships in Prague, Czechoslovakia, which the International Skating Union subsequently cancelled out of respect for the team.
On 25 May 2008, Kalitta Air Flight 207, a Boeing 747-200F, overran the shorter runway 20, crashed into a field and split in three. Four of the five people on board received minor injuries.

See also
 Brussels South Charleroi Airport
 Transport in Belgium

References

Notes

External links

  
 
 

 
Airports in Brussels
Airports in Flemish Brabant
Airports established in 1940
Airfields of the United States Army Air Forces Air Transport Command in the European Theater
Machelen
Steenokkerzeel
Zaventem
1940 establishments in Belgium